The Temple of Apollo Palatinus ('Palatine Apollo') was a temple on the Palatine Hill of ancient Rome, which was first dedicated by Augustus to his patron god Apollo.  It was only the second temple in Rome dedicated to the god, after the Temple of Apollo Sosianus.  It was sited next to the Temple of Cybele. Prior to excavations in 1956, these remains were thought to belong to the Temple of Jupiter Victor.

History
It was vowed by Octavian in return for the victory over Sextus Pompeius at the Battle of Naulochus in 36 BC and over Mark Antony and Cleopatra at the Battle of Actium 31 BC, and was built on a site where a lightning bolt had struck the interior of Augustus' property on the Palatine. It was dedicated on October 9, 28 BC.  The ludi saeculares, reinstituted by Augustus in 17 BC and also largely developed and funded by him, involved the new temple.

Augustus' private house was directly connected to the terrace of the sanctuary via frescoed halls and corridors.  This tight connection between the sanctuary and the house of the princeps, both dominating the Circus Maximus, repeated a trope already present in royal palaces of Hellenistic dynasties.

If still in use by the 4th-century, it would have been closed during the persecution of pagans in the late Roman Empire.

Description

The remains of the building were excavated in the 1960s by Gianfilippo Carettoni, in an area sloping steeply down towards the Circus Maximus.  The temple's precinct (the area Apollinis) was an artificial terrace (70 x 30 m), supported on opus quadratum sub-structures.  It contained an altar faced with the sculptural group "Myron's Herd", sited together on an elaborate base.  In the northern part of this terrace the temple was raised on a high podium, built in blocks of tufa and travertine in the load-bearing parts and elsewhere in cement.  The temple itself was in blocks of Carrara marble, with a pronaos as well as a facade of full columns on the front and the same order continued on half columns against the outside walls of the cella.

In the excavations different polychromatic terracotta slabs were recovered with reliefs of mythological subjects (of the "lastre Campana" type).

The adjoining library, the Bibliotheca Apollinis Palatini, according to the Forma Urbis Romae, was constituted from two apsidal halls, with the walls decorated by a row of columns.

Sculptures
The ancient sources state the temple had ivory doors and held numerous works of sculpture.  The pediment included two bas-reliefs of hunting the Galatians, from Delphi, and 6th century BC Chian art, with sculptures of the Niobids by Bupalus and Athenis. The cult group in the cella included a statue of Apollo Citharoedus, possibly by Scopas and perhaps from the sanctuary of Apollo at Rhamnus in Attica; a sculpture of Diana, by Timotheos; and one of Latona, sculpted by Cephisodotus.  Into shelves at the basis of the statue of Apollo were placed the Sibylline Books, transferred here from the temple of Jupiter on the Capitol (cf. Suetonius, Div. Aug. 31.3).

The temple was surrounded by a portico (the portico of the Danaids) with columns in yellow giallo antico marble, and with black marble statues of the fifty Danaids in between the column-shafts, a sculpture of Danaos with his sword unsheathed, and equestrian statues of the sons of Egypt.

See also
 List of Ancient Roman temples

Bibliography
Olivier Hekster and John Rich,
'Octavian and the thunderbolt: the Temple of Apollo Palatinus and Roman traditions of temple building', The Classical Quarterly (2006), 56: 149-168
['Apollo Palatinus and the manipulation of ritual']
Linda Jones Roccos, 'Apollo Palatinus: The Augustan Apollo on the Sorrento Base', American Journal of Archaeology, Vol. 93, No. 4 (Oct., 1989), pp. 571-588
Charles L. Babcock, 'Horace Carm. 1. 32 and the Dedication of the Temple of Apollo Palatinus', Classical Philology, Vol. 62, No. 3 (Jul., 1967), pp. 189-194
Ulrich Schmitzer, Guiding Strangers through Rome - Plautus, Propertius, Vergil, Ovid, Ammianus Marcellinus, and Petrarch
Miller, 'Apollo Medicus in the Augustan Age'
Jens Fischer, Vates Apollinis, vates Augusti – Das Verhältnis des palatinischen Apollonheiligtums zu Orakeln und sein Einfluss auf das Selbstverständnis der zeitgenössischen Dichter, GLB 26/2 (2021) 83-98
Jens Fischer, Folia ventis turbata – Sibyllinische Orakel und der Gott Apollon zwischen später Republik und augusteischem Principat (Studien zur Alten Geschichte 33), Göttingen 2022

References

External links
Platner and Ashby
Images and bibliography

Apollo
Palatinus
Augustan building projects
1st-century BC religious buildings and structures